The Kotoko people, also called Mser, Moria, Bara and Makari, are a Chadic ethnic group located in northern Cameroon, Chad and Nigeria.
The Kotoko population is composed of approximately 90,000 people of which the majority live in Cameroon. The Kotoko form part of the Chadic people. Their mother tongue is Lagwan. Most of the Kotoko are Sunni Muslims.

History 
They founded the Kotoko kingdom in the 1500 CE, and are considered to be descendants of the Sao civilization.

Economy and religion  
The Kotoko engage in fishing (with the aid of their long canoes) and in agriculture. The fish they catch is subsequently smoked or dried then sold in local markets. Wealthier families also raise cattle.

Most Kotoko profess Islam. Most of them are Sunni Muslims. The Kotoko converted to Islam via cultural influences from the Kanem-Bornu Empire. Many traditional beliefs and practices are incorporated into the Islamic practices of the Kotoko.

References

External links
 The Secret Of The Putchu Guinadji

Ethnic groups in Cameroon
Ethnic groups in Chad
Ethnic groups in Nigeria
Chadic-speaking peoples